Panilonco Airport  is an airport  north of Pichilemu, a Pacific coastal city in the O'Higgins Region of Chile.

It has ravines at each end and along its length.

It is owned by Sociedad Agrícola Ganadera y Forestal Las Cruces Ltda., and it was authorized by Directorate General of Civil Aviation on February 19, 1998.

See also
Transport in Chile
List of airports in Chile

References

External links
OpenStreetMap - Panilonco
OurAirports - Panilonco
FallingRain - Panilonco Airport

Airports in Pichilemu
Airports in Chile